A blind spot, scotoma, is an obscuration of the visual field. A particular blind spot known as the physiological blind spot, "blind point", or punctum caecum in medical literature, is the place in the visual field that corresponds to the lack of light-detecting photoreceptor cells on the optic disc of the retina where the optic nerve passes through the optic disc. Because there are no cells to detect light on the optic disc, the corresponding part of the field of vision is invisible. Processes in the brain interpolate the blind spot based on surrounding detail and information from the other eye, so it is not normally perceived.

Although all vertebrates have this blind spot, cephalopod eyes, which are only superficially similar, do not. In them, the optic nerve approaches the receptors from behind, so it does not create a break in the retina.

The first documented observation of the phenomenon was in the 1660s by Edme Mariotte in France. At the time it was generally thought that the point at which the optic nerve entered the eye should actually be the most sensitive portion of the retina; however, Mariotte's discovery disproved this theory.

The blind spot in humans is located about 12–15° temporally and 1.5° below the horizontal and is roughly 7.5° high and 5.5° wide.

Blind spot test

See also
Bias blind spot
Filling-in
Horizontal eccentricity

References

Eye
Vision